Talas is a district of Talas Region in north-western Kyrgyzstan. The administrative seat lies at Manas.

Demographics
Its population, according to the Population and Housing Census of 2009, was 58,867. All of them live in rural areas.

Ethnic composition
According to the 2009 Census, the ethnic composition of the Talas District (de jure population) was:

Rural communities and villages
In total, Talas District include 28 settlements in 13 rural communities. Each rural community can consist of one or several villages. The rural communities and settlements in the Talas District are:

 Aral (seat: Aral)
 Aydaraliev (seat: Köpürö-Bazar)
 Bekmoldoev (seat: Sasyk-Bulak; incl. Kara-Oy, Kengesh and Chong-Tokoy)
 Berdike Baatyr (seat: Kum-Aryk; incl. Kozuchak and Arashan)
 Dolon (seat: Tash-Aryk; incl. Ak-Jar and Orto-Aryk)
 Jerge-Tal (seat: Kyzyl-Tuu; incl. Chyyyrchyk and Kök-Kashat)
 Kalba (seat: Kalba; incl. Atay Ogonbaev, Balbal and Besh-Tash)
 Kara-Suu (seat: Kara-Suu)
 Kök-Oy (seat: Kök-Oy)
 Kuugandy (seat: Üch-Emchek)
 Nurjanov (seat: Jon-Aryk; incl. Kök-Tokoy)
 Ömüraliev (seat: Manas; incl. Chat-Bazar)
 Osmonkulov (seat: Taldy-Bulak; incl. Ak-Korgon)

References 

Districts of Talas Region